Showbiz Unlimited is a 30 minute late-night showbiz news and talk show aired over Intercontinental Broadcasting Corporation Channel 13. It is produced by Philippine Showbiz Republic, the fastest growing showbiz news portal in the country, founded in April 2014 and operated by DCR Managers, Inc. and aired every Saturday at 11:00 p.m. until 11:30 p.m. (PST) over IBC 13. The segments of the program, are "PNB: Pinakamainit na Balita" (showbiz news), "KBP: Kilig Balita Pa More" (updates on Philippine showbiz loveteams, ex. KathNiel, JaDine, AlDub), "BlindFold" (blind item revealing) and "Man On The Street", question and answer.

Initially, Showbiz Unlimited, was an online podcast show thru their website, and due to public demand, it went into television. PMPC membered-columnist Rommel Placente and Mildred Bacud, are the main hosts of the program, while Marla David served as the news anchor and Rodel Fernando worked as the segment host.

Currently, SU is now on season break. It will return on November 7, 2015.

See also
List of programs broadcast by Intercontinental Broadcasting Corporation

References

Intercontinental Broadcasting Corporation original programming
Philippine television talk shows
Entertainment news shows in the Philippines
2015 Philippine television series debuts
Filipino-language television shows